Handball competitions of the 2019 European Youth Summer Olympic Festival was held in ABU Arena and Baku Sports Hall from 22 to 27 July 2019.

Medal summary

Medal table

Medalists

Participating nations
A total of 240 athletes from 14 nations competed in handball at the 2019 European Youth Summer Olympic Festival:

 (30)
 (15)
 (15)
 (15)
 (30)
 (15)
 (15)
 (15)
 (15)
 (15)
 (15)
 (15)
 (15)
 (15)

References

External links

2019 European Youth Summer Olympic Festival
2019
2019 European Youth
2019 in handball